Vernon Orlando Bailey (1864–1942) was an American naturalist who specialized in mammalogy. He was employed by the Bureau of Biological Survey, United States Department of Agriculture (USDA).  His contributions to the Bureau of Biological Survey numbered roughly 13,000 specimens including many new species. Bailey published 244 monographs and articles during his career with the USDA, and is best known for his biological surveys of Texas, New Mexico, North Dakota, and Oregon.

Life and work

The fourth child of Emily and Hiram Bailey, Vernon Orlando Bailey was born on June 21, 1864 in Manchester, Michigan. Bailey and his pioneer family moved by horse-drawn wagon to Elk River, Minnesota in 1870. Hiram Bailey was a woodsman and a mason by trade that taught his son how to hunt at an early age. Since there was no school in the frontier town at the time, the Baileys schooled their children at home until they and several other local families established a school in 1873. Vernon briefly attended the University of Michigan and later Columbian University. While in Washington D.C., Bailey began collecting specimens and forwarding them to Dr. C. Hart Merriam, founder of the Bureau of Biological Survey (the predecessor to the current U.S. Fish and Wildlife Service).  Bailey was appointed special field agent to the Division of Economic Ornithology and Mammalogy in 1887.  By 1890, Bailey was awarded the title of Chief Field Naturalist.  He served in this position until his retirement in 1933. He was the president of the American Society of Mammalogists from 1933 to 1934, which he also helped found in 1919. 

During his career, his fieldwork focused on collecting and describing mammals, but also included birds reptiles and plants.  His efforts provided the bureau some 13,000 mammal specimens. In 1899, he married ornithologist Florence Augusta Merriam.  The two traveled the United States together and separately collecting and observing specimens in the field.  They co-authored several articles including "Cave life of Kentucky" with Leonard Giovannoli, published in the September 1933 edition of American Midland Naturalist (Vol. 14, No. 5).

Legacy 
Vernon Bailey Peak is a 6670 ft (2033 m) peak in Big Bend National Park in Texas.

Publications
The Prairie Ground Squirrels or Spermophiles of the Mississippi Valley, 1893
Biological Survey of Texas, 1905
A New Subspecies of Beaver from North Dakota, 1919-1920
Beaver Habits, Beaver Control and Possibilities of Beaver Farming, 1922
The Cave Life of Kentucky, The American Midland Naturalist, 1933

Associated eponyms
Chrysothamnus baileyi Woot. & Standl.
Ostrya baileyi Rose (Ostrya baileyi is a synonym for Ostrya knowltonii.)
Tillandsia baileyi Rose ex Small
Echinocereus baileyi Rose (This is now classified as a subspecies of Echinocereus reichenbachii.)
Sarcobatus baileyi Coville.
Yucca baileyi Woot. & Standl.
Campanula baileyi Eastwood. (Campanula baileyi is a synonym for Campanula wilkinsiana.)
Crotaphytus collaris baileyi Stejneger, 1890 
Canis lupus baileyi (Mexican wolf)

See also
Mount Bailey (Oregon)

References

External links

Finding aid to the Vernon Bailey papers, 1889–1941, from the Smithsonian Institution Archives
Vernon Bailey Papers, 1905, 1921-1929, 1939, also from the Smithsonian Institution Archives

1864 births
1942 deaths
American mammalogists
People from Manchester, Michigan
People from Elk River, Minnesota
19th-century American zoologists
20th-century American zoologists
United States Department of Agriculture people